All the Best: The Live Collection is a DVD by Tina Turner. The set includes a total of 25 songs and a 25-minute interview. The DVD was certified Gold by the RIAA in the United States.

Track listing
"Steamy Windows"
"Show Some Respect"
"I Can't Stand the Rain"
"River Deep – Mountain High"
"Missing You"
"GoldenEye"
"Addicted to Love"
"Private Dancer"
"Let's Stay Together"
"What's Love Got to Do with It" 
"I Don't Wanna Fight"
"In Your Wildest Dreams"
"When the Heartache Is Over"
"We Don't Need Another Hero"
"It's Only Love" (with Bryan Adams) 
"Tonight" (with David Bowie) 
"Nutbush City Limits"
"Better Be Good to Me"
"Proud Mary"
"Whatever You Need"

Extras
All the Best -- Interview
"The Best"
"Open Arms" (Live on Parkinson)
"Paradise Is Here"
"Be Tender with Me Baby"
"Cose Della Vita" (with Eros Ramazzotti)

Certifications

External links
 Amazon.com product page

References

Live video albums
2005 video albums
2005 live albums
Tina Turner video albums
Tina Turner live albums